Krishna, more commonly known as Krishnudu, is an actor in the Telugu film industry. He has mostly done supporting roles until Vinayakudu, where he played the lead male role. He is currently affiliated with YSRCP party.

Early life
Krishnudu was born as Alluri Krishnam Raju in a Kshatriya Raju Zamindari family and brought up in Razole, East Godavari district, Andhra Pradesh, India. He is known for his comedy roles. His great grandfather was Alluri Varha Venkata Suryanarayana Raju, Zamindar of Chinchinada. In 1970's, as a result of the Land Ceiling act introduced by the then-Prime Minister of India Indira Gandhi, Krishnudu family lost 4,500 acres of land, which was the largest amount of land in Andhra Pradesh.

Filmography

Films

TV series
 Yuva (Star Maa)
 Gangato Ram Babu (Zee Telugu)

References

External links
 
 Krishnudu at Oneindia.in
http://www.idlebrain.com/celeb/interview/krishnudu.html

Living people
Male actors from Andhra Pradesh
People from East Godavari district
Telugu comedians
Male actors in Telugu cinema
Indian male film actors
21st-century Indian male actors
Indian male television actors
Male actors in Telugu television
Indian male comedians
1975 births